Who's Your Brother? is a 1919 American silent drama film directed by John G. Adolfi and starring Edith Taliaferro, Frank Burbeck and Paul Panzer. It was also released under the alternative title Keep to the Right.

Cast
 Edith Taliaferro as Esther Field 
 Frank Burbeck as Stephen Field 
 Paul Panzer as Stephen Field (20 years earlier) 
 Coit Albertson as Dr. William Morris 
 Herbert Fortier as Robert E. Graham Sr. 
 Gladden James as Robert E. Graham Jr. 
 Elizabeth Garrison as Mrs. Robert Graham 
 Elizabeth Kennedy as The kid 
 Edith Stockton as Dorothy Graham

References

Bibliography
 Darby, William. Masters of Lens and Light: A Checklist of Major Cinematographers and Their Feature Films. Scarecrow Press, 1991.

External links

1919 films
1919 drama films
Silent American drama films
Films directed by John G. Adolfi
American silent feature films
1910s English-language films
American black-and-white films
1910s American films